Lobell is a surname.

Lobell may also refer to:

Adam Lobell House, a historic building in French Settlement, Louisiana
Mack Lobell  (1984–2016), a racehorse